Ercole Bottrigari (1531–1612) was an Italian scholar, mathematician, poet, music theorist, architect, and composer. The illegitimate son of Giovanni Battista Bottrigari, he was legitimized in 1538 and raised in his household in Bologna. He distinguished himself by reciting poetry at a court function and was rewarded with the orders of Knight of the Holy See and Lateran in 1542.

Life and works 
Bottrigari published books of madrigals, including Il primo libro di madrigali a quattro voci (Venice, 1558) and Libro terzo de madrigali a cinque voci (Venice, 1583). In 1546 with the help of his father Bottrigari established a small private press, but very few works from it survive. In 1551 he married Lucrezia Usberti (died 1591). In 1576 he fled to Ferrara, where he got to know Torquato Tasso, and where he gathered information for his 1594 treatise Il Desiderio, overo de' concerti di varii strumenti musicali. In 1586 he moved back to Bologna, where he was in touch with intellectuals such as Gioseffo Zarlino and Annibale Melone. His first musical treatise, Il Patricio (1593), dealt with classical subjects and was written in the form of a dialogue. Mascara, overo della fabbrica de' teatri (1598), never published, is an important work for modern scholars, describing theatrical structures and practice.

References

Links
Massimo Redaelli's edition of Ercole Bottrigari's manuscript works and their English translations are available online at www.mimtt.co.uk. Il Trimerone was published in saggi musicali italiani (online).

Notes

External links
 

1531 births
1612 deaths
Italian music theorists
16th-century Italian composers
17th-century Italian composers
Italian male composers
17th-century male musicians